Viana do Bolo (in Spanish Viana del Bollo) is a large municipality in Ourense in the Galicia region of north-west Spain. It is located in the south-east of the province.

Gallery

References

External links

official web site

Municipalities in the Province of Ourense